Storlien Station is a railway station located at Storlien in Åre Municipality, Sweden. The station and entire line Östersund–Trondheim was inaugurated by the king Oscar II in Storlien 1882. The village of Storlien is primarily a ski resort and border shopping place.

 there are no through passenger services. SJ Norge operates regional trains from Trondheim Central Station, and Norrtåg (Vy Tåg) operates regional trains from Sundsvall Central Station via Östersund Central Station, both twice a day, connecting at Storlien. Although the Swedish railway is electrified up to the border, the Norwegian line is not, so all service to Norway must be by diesel train. There is a decision from 2013 to electrify the Norwegian railway, and contracts were awarded in 2021, with electrical services scheduled to operate from 2023/2024.

|-
| Terminus || || Storlien–Sundsvall C (Norrtåg) || || Enafors

References

Railway stations in Jämtland County
Railway stations on the Meråker Line
Railway stations opened in 1886
1886 establishments in Sweden
Norway–Sweden border crossings